The village of Askaripur is located in Bijnor District in Uttar Pradesh, India between Noorpur and Moradabad. It is approximately 45 km from Bijnor.  It is connected to these two cities by roadways. The nearest airport is at New Delhi about 150 km from Askaripur.

History 
"Askaripur landmark is the gate which stands at the point where the road meets the highway.
It is higher village
The village also has concrete roads with in the village.

The village has 100% literacy rateNo citations. It also has the distinction of being a "Nirmal Gram".

The present government  has also sanctioned the construction of a water tank for the water supply within the village.

Nowadays this village is famous for most successful students and progress, this village looks like a town, all Road are made by CC, road are wide and systematically, Nowadays a group of people plays an important role in the progress of this village, they also made entry door of this village, which looks a model of building creation.

Geography 

Askaripur lies in the plains of Ganges and hence the land is highly fertile. Soil found is mostly Alluvial.

Askaripur lies in the jurisdiction of Noorpur block, division Chandpur.

Demographics 

As of 2001 India census, Askaripur had a population of 4,175. Males constitute 53.5% of the population and females 46.5%. Number of households were 664.

Education 

Askaripur has a Government aided Inter College.
Askaripur has two Government primary school and some private primary schools.

See also 

 Chandpur
 Noorpur
 Bijnor
 Uttar Pradesh

References 

 
 

Cities and towns in Bijnor district